The Rifstangi is a small peninsula in northeast Iceland, located on the larger Melrakkaslétta  peninsula. It is the northernmost tip of mainland Iceland.

In 2015, it recorded the shortest day in Iceland at 2 hours 14 minutes.

Peninsulas of Iceland